Inktel is a global outsourcer of business services and direct marketing services, including fulfillment (as well as inventory management and order processing) and call center services, but also including other services such as direct mail/Lettershop, e-commerce, data management, social media and graphic design. Inktel's clients include federal/state/local government agencies, non-profit organizations, and various Fortune 500 companies, including Conagra Brands.

History
Inktel was founded in Miami in 1997 by Ricky, Dan, and Ed Arriola, the sons of Joe Arriola, founder of the printing company Avanti Press. In 2001, Inktel was spun off from Avanti when the printing company was sold. As of 2003, Ricky Arriola is CEO of the company, his brother Eddy is executive vice president, and their brother Dan is director of business development.

In 2003, the firm had more than $40 million in annual revenues. 

In 2009, Inktel was named the "Best Company to Work For" in the state of Florida. The company received a Silver Award at the 2018 Stevie Awards in the "Employer of the Year – Business Services" category.

References

Companies based in Miami
Call centre companies
Business process outsourcing companies
Direct marketing